The list of shipwrecks in April 1914 includes ships sunk, foundered, grounded, or otherwise lost during April 1914.

1 April

2 April

3 April

5 April

6 April

7 April

8 April

9 April

15 April

16 April

17 April

19 April

20 April

21 April

22 April

23 April

27 April

28 April

29 April

30 April

References

1914-04
 04
1914